This was the 13th edition of the tournament, which was part of the 2009 ITF Women's Circuit, a tier below the 2009 WTA Tour. It was held in Lexington, Kentucky, United States from 20 to 26 July 2009 on outdoor hardcourts. The prize money for women was US$50,000.

Melanie Oudin, the defending champion, declined to participate that year.

Sania Mirza won in the final, defeating top seed Julie Coin 7-6(5), 6-4.

Seeds

Draw

Finals

Top half

Bottom half

References
 http://www.itftennis.com/procircuit/tournaments/women's-tournament/info.aspx?tournamentid=1100019708

2009 ITF Women's Circuit
2009 WS